Brit Pack may refer to:

 The Brit Pack actors of the 1980s, including Gary Oldman and Tim Roth 
 The Young British Artists of the 1990s including Sarah Lucas and Damien Hirst, sometimes referred to as the "Brit Pack"